Hefei is the capital and largest city of Anhui Province, People's Republic of China. A prefecture-level city, it is the political, economic, and cultural center of Anhui. Its population was 9,369,881 as of the 2020 census and its built-up (or metro) area made up of four urban districts plus Feidong, Feixi and Changfeng counties being urbanized, was home to 7,754,481 inhabitants. Located in the central portion of the province, it borders Huainan to the north, Chuzhou to the northeast, Wuhu to the southeast, Tongling to the south, Anqing to the southwest and Lu'an to the west. A natural hub of communications, Hefei is situated to the north of Chao Lake and stands on a low saddle crossing the northeastern extension of the Dabie Mountains, which forms the divide between the Huai and Yangtze rivers.

The present-day city dates from the Song dynasty. Before World War II, Hefei remained essentially an administrative centre and the regional market for the fertile plain to the south. It has gone through a growth in infrastructure in recent years. Hefei is the location of Experimental Advanced Superconducting Tokamak, an experimental superconducting tokamak magnetic fusion energy reactor.

Hefei is a world leading city for scientific research, with its ranking placed at 16th globally, 8th in the Asia-Pacific and 6th in China (behind Beijing, Shanghai, Nanjing, Guangzhou and Wuhan), as tracked by the Nature Index in 2022. The city is represented by several major universities, including the University of Science and Technology of China, Hefei University of Technology, Anhui University, Anhui Agricultural University and Anhui Medical University. Notably, the University of Science and Technology of China is one of the top 100th comprehensive public research universities in the world.

History

From the 8th to the 6th centuries BC, Hefei was the site of many small states, later a part of the Chu kingdom. Many archaeological finds dating from this period have been made. The name 'Hefei' was first given to the county set up in the area under the Han dynasty in the 2nd century BC.

In the 3rd century AD, the Battle of Xiaoyao Ford was fought at Xiaoyao Ford in Hefei. Zhang Liao, a general of the Wei state, led 800 picked cavalry to defeat the 200,000-strong army from Wei's rival state Wu. Several decades of warring in Hefei between Wu and Wei followed this battle.

During the 4th to the 6th centuries AD, this crucial border region between northern and southern states was much fought over; its name and administrative status were consequently often changed. During the Sui (581–618) and Tang (618–907) periods, it became the seat of Lu prefecture—a title it kept until the 15th century, when it became a superior prefecture named Luzhou.

The present city dates from the Song dynasty (960–1126), the earlier Hefei having been some distance farther north. In the 10th year of Xining (1077 AD), the taxes collected from the Luchow Prefecture were 50315 Guan, approximately 25 million today's Chinese Yuan, with a ranking of the amount of taxes was the 11th(following Kaifeng, Hangzhou, Qinzhou, Chuzhou, Chengdu, Zizhou, Xingyuan, Mianzhou, Zhenzhou, Suzhou) among all the prefectures of Song Dynasty. During the 10th century, it was for a while the capital of the independent Wu kingdom (902–938) and was an important center of the Southern Tang state (937–975).

After 1127 it became a center of the defenses of the Southern Song dynasty (1126–1279) against the Jin (Jurchen) invaders in the Jin–Song wars, as well as a flourishing center of trade between the two states. When the Chinese Republic was founded in 1911, the superior prefecture was abolished, and the city took the name of Hefei. The city was known as Luchow or Liu-tcheou (p Luzhou) during the Ming and Qing dynasties (after the 14th century to the 19th century). Hefei was the temporary capital for Anhui from 1853 to 1862. It was renamed as Hefei County in 1912. Following the Chinese victory in the Second Sino-Japanese War in 1945, Hefei was made the capital of Anhui.

Before World War II, Hefei remained essentially an administrative center and the regional market for the fertile plain to the south. It was a collecting center for grain, beans, cotton, and hemp, as well as a center for handicraft industries manufacturing cloth, leather, bamboo goods, and ironware.

The construction in 1912 of the Tianjin–Pukou railway, farther east, for a while made Hefei a provincial backwater, and much of its importance passed to Bengbu. In 1932–36, however, a Chinese company built a railway linking Hefei with Yuxikou (on the Yangtze opposite Wuhu) to the southeast and with the Huai River at Huainan to the north. While this railway was built primarily to exploit the rich coalfield in northern Anhui, it also did much to revive the economy of the Hefei area by taking much of its produce to Wuhu and Nanjing.

Although Hefei was a quiet market town of only about 30,000 in the mid-1930s, its population grew more than tenfold in the following 20 years. The city's administrative role was strengthened by the transfer of the provincial government from Anqing in 1945, but much of its new growth derived from its development as an industrial city. A cotton mill was opened in 1958, and a thermal generating plant, using coal from Huainan, was established in the early 1950s. It also became the seat of an industry producing industrial chemicals and chemical fertilizers. In the late 1950s an iron and steel complex was built. In addition to a machine-tool works and engineering and agricultural machinery factories, the city has developed an aluminum industry and a variety of light industries. There are several universities based in the city.

Geography

Though, the lake has unfortunately been polluted with nitrogen and phosphorus, in recent decades, the situation is improving due to efforts by both the government and the people.

Climate
Hefei features a humid subtropical climate (Köppen Cfa) with four distinct seasons. Winters are damp and cold, with January lows dipping just below freezing and January averaging . The city sees irregular snowfalls that rarely turn significant. Springs are generally relatively pleasant if somewhat erratic. In the months of June, July, August, and often September, daily temperatures can reach or surpass  with high humidity levels being the norm. Autumn in Hefei sees a gradual cooling and drying. With monthly percent possible sunshine ranging from 35 percent in March to 50 percent in August, the city receives 1,868 hours of bright sunshine annually.

Air Pollution

Air quality typically diminishes in May and June when the city is blanketed by smog caused by the smoke generated as farmers outside the city burn their fields in preparation for planting the next crop.

Administrative divisions and demographics

Demographics
The majority of the population in Hefei are Han Chinese.  There are a comparatively small number of Hui Chinese living in the city, for whom a few mosques have been constructed.  Of the more than five million people in the city, some are migrant workers from other parts of Anhui.

Administration
The prefecture-level city of Hefei administers 9 county-level divisions, including 4 districts, 1 County-city and 4 counties.

Hefei subdivisions area (km2), population (According to 2010 Census) and population density (per km2).

Economy
The GDP was ¥1141.28 billion in 2021. The GDP per capita was ¥121187(ca.US$18784) in 2021.Ranked top 20 cities of China.

Before the Chinese Civil War, Hefei's main industry was agriculture. After World War II, the capital of Anhui was moved from Anqing to Hefei. To assist the development of the city, many talented people were sent in from other parts of the country. Modern-day Hefei has machinery, electronics, chemistry, steel, textile, and cigarette industries, among others.

In the summer of 2005, the municipal government implemented changes designed to beautify the city by demolishing thousands of illegally built structures, and clearing away long-established marketplaces in many parts of the city. While these actions removed many unlicensed, and often poorly-constructed food stalls which had been contributing to the spread of disease and which posed fire hazards, these changes also removed longstanding businesses that had lined many streets throughout the city overnight. The impact on the local economy was felt immediately as hundreds, if not thousands, of low paid workers no longer had employment.

Hefei has been identified by the Economist Intelligence Unit in the November 2010 Access China White Paper as a member of the CHAMPS (Chongqing, Hefei, Anshan, Ma'anshan, Pingdingshan and Shenyang), an economic profile of the top 20 emerging cities in China.

Hefei was identified by The Economist in December 2012 as the world's No.1 fastest growing metropolitan economy.

Transportation

Hefei has been the provincial capital since 1945 (before it was Lihuang, which is today's Jinzhai) and is a natural center of transportation, being situated to the north of Lake Chao and standing on a low saddle crossing the northeastern extension of the Dabie Mountains, which form the divide between the Huai and Yangtze rivers. From Hefei there is easy water transport via the lake to the Yangtze River opposite Wuhu.

Land
Important land routes run through Hefei, including:

1. G3 Beijing-Taipei Expressway (京台高速公路 From Beijing to Pingtan, and was designed to cross the Taiwan Strait to connect the highways in Taipei)

2. G40 Shanghai-Xi'an Expressway (沪陕高速公路 From Shanghai to Xi'an)

3. G42 Shanghai-Chengdu Expressway (沪蓉高速公路 From Shanghai to Chengdu)

4. G4212 Hefei-Anqing Expressway (合安高速公路 From Hefei to Anqing, a spur of G42)

5. G5011 Wuhu-Hefei Expressway (芜合高速公路 From Wuhu to Hefei, a spur of G50)

6. China National Highway 206 (烟汕线 From Yantai to Shantou)

7. China National Highway 312 (沪霍线 From Shanghai to Khorgas)

8. China National Highway 346 (沪康线 From Shanghai to Ankang)

9. S24 Changshu-Hefei Expressway (常合高速公路 From Changshu to Hefei)

10.S17 Bengbu-Hefei Expressway (蚌合高速公路 From Bengbu to Hefei)

11. G3W Dezhou-Shangrao Expressway (德上高速公路 From Dezhou to Shangrao)

There are two main train stations in Hefei. The newest one is Hefei South railway station (Hefeinan station, 合肥火车南站) where most high-speed trains pass through. Many city buses serve this station, for instance the 108 from the East gate of the University of Science and Technology's East campus on Susong road. It has a very comprehensive taxi rank with multiple queues to avoid a long wait. There are many fast food restaurants in the departure hall with seating. There are not so many options for arrivals, a small cafe and a takeaway kfc booth. There is an ATM in the ticket sales area next to the security gates for the departure hall.

The alternative station is Hefei railway station which is smaller and older. This has only one taxi queue, directly opposite the main exit. There is fast food, a post office and a China mobile store in the same courtyard next to the arrival gates.

There are some small stations such as Feidong Station, Feixi Station, Shuijiahu Station, Chaohu Station, Chaohu East railway station (Chaohudong station; 巢湖火车东站), Hefeibeicheng Station (Hefei Northtown Station 合肥北城火车站), Lujiang Station and so on. These stations are mostly located in small towns or played commuting roles.

Important railways that run through Hefei, including:
1. Shanghai-Wuhan-Chengdu High-Speed Railway

2. Hefei-Fuzhou high-speed railway (合福高速铁路 Play as part of Beijing-Taipei high-speed railway)

3. Hefei-Bengbu high-speed railway (合蚌高速铁路 A spur of Beijing-Shanghai high-speed railway)

4. Shangqiu-Hangzhou high-speed railway (商合杭高速铁路 The northern part, Shangqiu-Hefei High-Speed Railway will play as a part of Beijing-Hong Kong high-speed railway. Under Construction)

5. Hefei-Anqing-Jiujiang high-speed railway (合安九高速铁路 Play as a part of Beijing-Hong Kong High-Speed Railway.)

6. Hefei-Qingdao high-speed railway (合青高速铁路 Proposed)

7. Nanjing-Xi'an high-speed railway (宁西高速铁路 Proposed)

8. Huainan railway (淮南铁路 From Huainan-Wuhu)

9. Hefei-Jiujiang railway

10. Nanjing-Xi'an railway

11. Lujiang-Tongling railway (庐铜铁路 Under Construction)

In 2008 the thoroughfare Chang Jiang Road is undergoing a renovation project to widen the roads and to create a bus route in the center of the road, with bus stations at islands that are connected to the sidewalks by skyways. The First Ring Road is also undergoing construction, with traffic lights being replaced by overpasses and ramps built to connect the First Ring Road and all major intersecting roads. Both projects are intended to ease the traffic Hefei now experiences at rush hour.

Air
Hefei Xinqiao International Airport replaced the old Hefei Luogang International Airport and started its operation on May 30, 2013, 00:00. This new domestic aviation hub is located in Gaoliu Village situated in the northwestern part of Hefei City. The first arriving flight was China Eastern Airlines flight MU5172 from Beijing Capital International Airport. The first departing flight was China Eastern Airlines MU5468 to Shanghai Pudong International Airport.
Hefei Xinqiao International Airport provides scheduled passenger service to major airports in China and other international cities. Destinations include Hong Kong, Macao, Singapore, Taipei (Taoyuan, Songshan), Kaohsiung, Taichung, Seoul, Cheongju, Yangyang, Jeju, Osaka, Nagoya, Shizuoka, Okayama, Boracay Island, Bali Island, Frankfurt, Siem Reap, Bangkok, Phuket Island and Krabi Island.

Subway

Hefei Metro is a rapid transit rail network under construction that will eventually serve both urban and rural areas of Hefei. As planned, Line 1 covers a total distance of  starting from Hefei Railway Station. It was inaugurated in December 2016.

In February 2013, Metro Line 2 also began its construction. It is being built alongside the Changjiang Dong Road, Changjiang Zhong Road and Changjiang Xi Road, which is a major passenger corridor in the east–west direction. It will pass through the city center area and connect to a transit point where passengers will be able to take the shuttle bus to Hefei Xinqiao International Airport. The Line 2 was opened on December 26, 2017.

In November 2015, Metro Line 3 construction began. Line 3 was opened on December 26, 2019. Line 3 connects the New Station Exploitative-experimental Zone and the Economic Technology Development District, from the vocational education town to the university town.

In 2016, Metro Line 4 construction began. Line 4 was opened on December 26, 2021. Line 4 connects the New Station Exploitative-experimental Zone and the High Technology Development District.

In 2017, Metro Line 5 construction began. The south part of Line 5 was opened on December 26, 2020. Line 5 connects Binhu New District and the Beicheng (North city) New District. The north part of Line 5 is expected to open at the end of 2022.

Alongside Line 1, Line 2, Line 3, Line 4 and Line 5, Hefei is also planning to build other 12 metro lines, 4 lines of intra-metropolitan rail transit (to Lu'an, Huainan, Lujiang and Chaohu) and 3 lines of tram and hopefully accomplish the project by 2030.

Bus
Normal buses included 1-33, 35–53, 56,57,59-68, 70, 72, 76, 78, 99, 101–141, 143, 145–150, 152, 154–159, 161–163, 166, 226, 232–235, 300–305, 350–359, 399, 401, 502–513, 516–519, 521, 522, 525–533, 535–539, 577, 601–606, 621, 622, 650–657, 665, 670, 681–683, 686, 690–699, 702–710, 801–805,809,810,901–903. And there are also several buses lines which severed for Feixi county(begins with X, such as X201), Feidong county(begins with D, such as D199), Changfeng county (begins with C, such as C131) and Chaohu city (begins with H, such as H105).

There are 8 major lines of Bus Rapid Transit in Hefei, including:

Bus Rapid Transit Line 1 (B1): from the downtown to the Binhu New Area.

Bus Rapid Transit Line 2 (B2): from Previous Research Institute of China University of Science and Technology to Wang Tong Bus Station  (Along Wangjiang Rd. )

Bus Rapid Transit Line 3 (B3): from No.2 buses company to Hefei No.2 Hospital New Area (Along Changjiang Rd. )

Bus Rapid Transit Line 4 (B4): from Hefei Information Technology University to Binhu International Convention and Exhibition Center (Along Ziyun Rd. )

Bus Rapid Transit Line 5 (B5): from Hefeinan Railway Station to Binhu Wanda Bus Station (Along Baohe Avenue. )

Bus Rapid Transit Line 7 (B7): from Provincial Administrative Center to Xinghua Park (Along Baohe Avenue. )

Bus Rapid Transit Line 9 (B9): from  Road Bus Station to City Square (Along Fuyang North Road. )

Bus Rapid Transit Line 11 (B11): from Feixi Railway Station to Nanqili Station (Along Jinzhai South Road. )

And there are several commuter lines operating, which only run at designated time or having a large interval, including:

T1 from West Bus Terminus to No.7 High School New Campus, T2 from Liushutang to No.7 High School New Campus, T3 from North Square of Hefei Railway Station to Hefei Economic and Trade Tourism School, T5 from North Square of Hefei Railway Station to Gongda Vocational and Technical College, T6 from North Square of Hefei Railway Station to Hefei Industrial School, T7 from Hefeinan Railway Station to University Park, T8 from Gedadian to E-Commerce Park of the Youth, T9 from Public Transportation Group (No.2 Hospital) to No.10 High School New Campus, T10 from Shifu Square to No.10 High School New Campus, T12 from Anjuyuan() to Provincial Administration Center, T13 from CPPCC of Anhui Province to Provincial Administration Center, T15 from Binhu Vanke City to Provincial Administration Center, T16 from Wanghucheng to Provincial Administration Center, T18 as a loop line of the CBD of Binhu New Area, T19 as a loop line of the Promoting Zone of Binhu New Area, T21 from Cuozhen to Fuxing Community, T22 from Shuidong Rd. to Sanlian University Branch Campus, T24 from Cuozhen to Qiaotouji, T26 from Feihe to Hefei International Port.

Research
Hefei plays an important role in scientific research in China. It has seven national laboratories, second only to Beijing: The National Synchrotron Radiation Laboratory, the Hefei National Laboratory for Physical Sciences at the Microscale, both of which are under the University of Science and Technology of China. It also has the Institute of Solid State Physics, Institute of Plasma Physics, Institute of Intelligent Machines, High Magnetic Field Laboratory (founded in 2008), Anhui Institute of Optics and Fine Mechanics, all of which are under the Hefei Institutes of Physical Science which belongs to the Chinese Academy of Sciences.

Hefei is the location of Experimental Advanced Superconducting Tokamak, an experimental superconducting tokamak magnetic fusion energy reactor.

The No. 105 Hospital of the People's Liberation Army, located in Hefei, is reportedly the site of the first human trials using CRISPR genome editing, doing so in 2015.

Universities

University of Science and Technology of China (USTC)
Hefei University of Technology (HFUT)
Anhui University (AHU)
Anhui Agricultural University (AHAU)
Anhui Medical University (AHMU)
Anhui University of Chinese Medicine (AUCM)
Anhui Jianzhu University (AHJU)
Hefei Normal University (HNU)
Hefei University (HU)
Beihang University (BUAA) - Hefei Campus
National University of Defense Technology (NUDT) - Hefei Campus
Beijing Foreign Studies University (BFSU) - Hefei Campus
Tianjin University (TJU) - Hefei Graduate School
Peking University (PKU) - Hefei Graduate School
Tsinghua University (THU) - Hefei Institute of Public Safety Research

Yicheng Prison
Yicheng Prison is located within the city. It was built during the 1983 "Strike Hard" campaign and was formerly Hefei Zhenxing Machine Parts Factory. On June 15, 1984, the Prov. Justice Dept. decided to change the name of the Machine Parts Factory's Internal Dept. to the Prov. Independent LRC. On March 17, 1986, the city's Party Committee and government agreed to the change. On April 26 more than 400 inmates were transferred to Hefei Shangzhangwei Farm and Baihu Farm. In February 1992 a secondary country level prison was created at the Shangzhangwei Farm. In August 1992 the Hefei City LRD level was upgraded by the government. June 1996 the prison was changed to its present name. It is currently controlled by Hefei city. It mainly houses prisoners with sentences of less than 5 years and houses up to 1000 prisoners a year. In the past 20 years, nearly 20,000 inmates have completed their sentences here. The prison mainly cultivates vegetables and rice but also cooperates with the Zhejiang Rongguang Group and produces soccer training shoes, soccer balls, tourism products, and other products.

Sport
Hefei has its own football team called Anhui Jiufang, who in the 2007–08 season were promoted from the Chinese Football Association Yi League to the Chinese Football Association Jia League which is the second highest tier of Chinese football. It was acquired by Tianjin Runyulong in 2011.

Sites of interest

Sanhe Town, ancient town which has a history of more than 2,500 years.
Xiaoyaojin Park, a public park sitting on the ancient site of the Battle of Xiaoyao Ford.
Temple of Lord Bao, built in 1066 near the tomb of Lord Bao.
 Li Hongzhang's Former Residence, built in the late 19th century and fully restored by the 1990s.
Hui Garden (Opened to the public in September 2001)
Children's Welfare Institute (a.k.a. "Social Welfare Institute"), children's orphanage
Anhui Laomingguang Stadium, the home ground of Anhui Jiufang, but also used for other public sporting events.

Notable people
Bao Zheng (999–1062), Northern Song dynasty bureaucrat and judge whose name has become synonymous with judicial wisdom and uprightness.
Li Hongzhang (1823–1901), prominent late Qing dynasty bureaucrat and diplomat.
Liu Mingchuan (1836–1896). Statesman during the late Qing dynasty, first governor of Taiwan.
Duan Qirui (1865–1936), the Provisional Chief Executive of Republic of China (in Beijing) from November 24, 1924, to April 20, 1926.
Susan Wu Rathbone (1921–2019), community leader in Queens, New York.
Yang Chen-Ning, (b. 1922), 1957 Nobel Physics Prize laureate, for their work on parity nonconservation of weak interaction. One of the two earliest Chinese to receive the prize.
Wu Bangguo(b. 1941), Chinese politician.
Li Keqiang(b. 1955), PM of Chinese government.
Yang Yuanqing (b. 1964), Chairman of Board of Lenovo.
Han Qizhi, (b. 1970), first person to climb the Jin Mao Tower, then the tallest building in China.
Jin Jing (b. 1981), Paralympic fencer.
Xu Song (b. 1986), Chinese singer.
Chen Xiao (b. 1987), actor.
Yang Yang (b. 1991), actor.
Hu Bingqing (b. 1992), actress.

Sister cities 
 Kurume, Fukuoka, Japan (1980)
 Freetown, Sierra Leone (1984)
 Bujumbura, Burundi (1986)
 Columbus, Ohio, United States (1988)
 Aalborg, Denmark (1989)
 Lleida, Catalonia, Spain (1998)
 Wonju, Gwandong, South Korea (2002)
 Darebin, Victoria, Australia (2003)
 Belfast, Northern Ireland, United Kingdom  (2005)
 Osnabrück, Lower Saxony, Germany (2006)
 Ufa, Bashkortostan, Russia (2016)

See also 
 List of twin towns and sister cities in China

References

External links

Hefei Online Government

 
Provincial capitals in China